The 1998–99 Illinois State Redbirds men's basketball team represented Illinois State University during the 1998–99 NCAA Division I men's basketball season. The Redbirds, led by sixth year head coach Kevin Stallings, played their home games at Redbird Arena and competed as a member of the Missouri Valley Conference.

They finished the season 16–15, 7–11 in conference play to finish in seventh place. They were the number seven seed for the Missouri Valley Conference tournament. They were victorious over Drake University in their opening round game but defeated by Creighton University in their quarterfinal game.

Roster

Schedule

|-
!colspan=9 style=|Regular Season

|-
!colspan=9 style=|Diet PepsiMissouri Valley Conference {MVC} tournament

References

Illinois State Redbirds men's basketball seasons
Illinois State
Illinois State Redbirds Men's
Illinois State Redbirds Men's